Võ Ngọc Đức (born 10 October 1994) is a Vietnamese footballer who plays as a defender for V.League 1 club Sông Lam Nghệ An and the Vietnam national football team.

References 

1994 births
Living people
Vietnamese footballers
Association football defenders
V.League 1 players
Song Lam Nghe An FC players
People from Nghệ An province